The Driftin' Kid is a 1941 American Western film directed by Robert Emmett Tansey and written by Robert Emmett Tansey and Frances Kavanaugh. The film stars Tom Keene, Betty Miles, Frank Yaconelli, Glenn Strange, Stanley Price and Fred Hoose. The film was released on October 17, 1941, by Monogram Pictures.

Plot

Cast          
Tom Keene as Tom Sterling / Jim Vernon
Betty Miles as Betty Lane
Frank Yaconelli as Lopez Mendoza
Glenn Strange as Jeff Payson 
Stanley Price as Rex Jenkins
Fred Hoose as Sheriff Parker
Slim Andrews as Slim Chance
Gene Alsace as Blackie Thompson
Steve Clark as Roger Lane
Earl Douglas as Ace Reed
James Sheridan as Buckhorn

References

External links
 

1941 films
1940s English-language films
American Western (genre) films
1941 Western (genre) films
Monogram Pictures films
Films directed by Robert Emmett Tansey
American black-and-white films
1940s American films